The Fiat Campagnola is a heavy-duty off-road vehicle produced by Fiat. Production started in 1951 and it was upgraded in 1974. It was inspired by the Willys Jeep.

Fiat 1101 "Campagnola" (1951-73)

Civilian models

Fiat 1107 "Nuova Campagnola" (1974-87)

The Campagnola was redesigned for launch in June 1974 and in this form produced until 1987.

The new vehicle used the petrol engine of the Fiat 132, but with a longer stroke which increased the capacity to 1,995 cc. - the same enlarged engine turned up in the Fiat 132 itself two years later, albeit with twin overhead camshafts. There was a light alloy cylinder head: instead of the twin overhead camshafts of the 132, the engine in the Campagnola had a single side-mounted camshaft driven by a toothed belt, the valve movement being driven by pushrods and rockers. 

As an option, a Sofim 2.5 litre diesel engine was also available.

The large square engine compartment gave easy access to the engine bay which was designed to permit "wading" up to 70 cm deep.

The 57 litre fuel tank was positioned well out of range from rocks and flying stones, under the twin passenger seat beside the driver.

Torsion bars suspended all four wheels, with two shock absorbers for each of the rear wheels and a single one for each of the front wheels. All six shocks used were of identical specification and thus interchangeable.  Road testers from the UK commended the smoothness of the ride over rough ground which evidently compared very favourably with that offered by the Land Rover of the time.

A military version was introduced in 1976 (AR76) and in 1979, after a new update, it was called AR76.

Engines

Others

Renault derivative
In 1976 the French army was about to replace its Jeeps and several prototype series were made: Peugeot proposed the P4, an adaptation of the Mercedes G-Wagen, powered by the gasoline engine of Peugeot 504. Citroën offered its own version of the Volkswagen Iltis, using the CX Athena engine and renamed as C44.  The Renault Campagnola TRM500 was derivative of Fiat Campagnola and used engine of Renault R20. Finally the Peugeot P4 was chosen as new army jeep.

Zastava
The Campagnola was also license-built by Zastava Trucks, in Yugoslavia.

See also
Alfa Romeo Matta
Iveco Massif

References

Campagnola
Off-road vehicles
All-wheel-drive vehicles
Military light utility vehicles
Military vehicles of Italy